Brady Island is an island in Franz Josef Land, Arkhangelsk Oblast, Russia.

Geography 

Brice, Bliss, and Leigh-Smith Island are located to the north and west of Brady Island, beyond the Sidorov Strait (Russian: пролив Сидорова).

History 

The island was discovered by Benjamin Leigh Smith in 1880. It is most likely named after Henry Bowman Brady, a zoologist who examined collections from both the Austro-Hungarian North Pole expedition and Albert Hastings Markham’s expedition in 1879. The expedition also gave the name Cape Speelman to what is now Cape Krasovsky, after Jhr. M. H. Speelman (1852–1907), a lieutenant on the Dutch Arctic expeditions 1878–1879. The current name was given in 1950, in honour of Russian scientist Feodosy Krasovsky.

See also 

 Franz Josef Land
 List of islands of Russia

References 

Islands of Franz Josef Land
Uninhabited islands of Russia